4 Street Southeast is a planned and approved CTrain light rail station in Calgary, Alberta, Canada part of the Green Line. Construction will begin in 2023 and complete in 2027 as part of construction stage one, segment 2A. The station is located in Beltline, immediately southeast of downtown Calgary near the confluence of the Bow River and Elbow River. 

The station will be an integral part of the redevelopment of Calgary's Rivers District, a high-density urban entertainment centre. There will be direct access to the future Calgary Event Centre, the Calgary Stampede grounds, the Scotiabank Saddledome, the National Music Centre, the Central Library, the BMO Centre, St. Patrick's Island and East Village from the station. It will be located under 11 Avenue SE near Olympic Way SE.  Additionally, the station and the surrounding streetscape will feature Crime Prevention Through Environmental Design principals to mitigate crime.

References 

CTrain stations
Railway stations scheduled to open in 2027
Railway stations located underground in Canada